Arif Shah bin Omar Shah (born 2 November 1956) is a Malaysian politician and member of United Malays National Organisation.

Arif Shah was a former Member of Legislative Assembly for Seberang Jaya, Penang for two consecutive terms since 2004. He was nicknamed by the local Chinese community as "pek moh" (白毛), meaning "white hair" in Hokkien, because he was full of white hair.

Early life and education
Arif Shah was born on 2 November 1956. Arif Shah can speak Mandarin and Hokkien due to his early education at SRJK(C) Hun Lian, Taiping, Perak and followed by primary school extension at SRJK(C) Chong Hwa Wei Sin, Kuala Terengganu, Terengganu. He then continued his education at SMJK(C) Chong Hwa Wei Sin, Kuala Terengganu and continued his studies at Chong Hwa High School, Gombak, Kuala Lumpur. His ability to speak Mandarin and Hokkien is expected to be able to understand the problems of the Chinese community and be able to communicate with them.

Next he studied at the Federal Institute of Technology majoring in civil engineering. Then to Graber International, California, United States in the department of building materials.

Misidenfication
On 15 March 2008, a demonstration was held in front of the Komtar building, Penang. The demonstration was broadcast by TV3 and RTM. They were orchestrated by the opposition in the Penang State Legislative Assembly. There was a newspaper that wrongly reported that Arif Shah was also present in this gathering, because the picture showed a white-haired man who was thought to be Arif Shah, but was actually Datuk Musa Sheikh Fadzir. They objected to the announcement of the Chief Minister of Penang, Lim Guan Eng to abolish the New Economic Policy and replaced it with the Malaysian Economic Agenda.

Honours
 :
 Recipient of the Meritorious Service Medal (PJK)
 :
 Companion Class I of the Exalted Order of Malacca (DMSM) - Datuk (2007)

Election results

References

External links
 Laman YB Arif Shah

1956 births
Living people
Malaysian Muslims
United Malays National Organisation politicians
Members of the Penang State Legislative Assembly